This article shows a '''list of shopping malls in Ghana:

List
Greater Accra Region
Accra Mall
Marina Mall Accra
Junction Mall 
Oxford Street Mall
West Hills Mall
Achimota Retail Centre
A&C Mall
Oyarifa Mall
China Mall

Ashanti Region
Kumasi City Mall
KNUST Jubilee Mall

References

 
Ghana
Shopping malls